Governor Hodges may refer to:

George H. Hodges (1866–1947), 19th Governor of Kansas (1913–1915)
Thomas Hodges (Governor of Bombay) (died 1771). Governor of Bombay from 27 January 1767 to 23 February 1771
Luther H. Hodges (1898–1974), Governor of North Carolina
Jim Hodges (born November 19, 1956) Governor of South Carolina from 1999 until 2003